Richard Edward Ion Calvocoressi  (b. 5 May 1951) is a British museum curator and art historian.

Career
Calvocoressi was born in Westerham, Kent, one of three sons of Major Ion Calvocoressi. He was educated at Eton College, and graduated from Magdalen College, Oxford and the Courtauld Institute of Art. He served as an assistant keeper of modern art at the Tate Gallery from 1979 until 1987, and was director of the Scottish National Gallery of Modern Art in Edinburgh from 1987 until 2007. He then served as director of the Henry Moore Foundation, and in 2015 became the director and senior curator of the Gagosian Gallery.

Calvocoressi was appointed to the Reviewing Committee on the Export of Works of Art on 13 November 2012, serving until 12 November 2016. He was subsequently reappointed for another four year term.

Personal life
He married Francesca Roberts in 1976. They have three children.

He was made a Commander of the Order of the British Empire in 2008 for "services to the Arts, particularly in Scotland".

Selected publications

References

External links
 
 

1951 births
People from Westerham
British people of Greek descent
People educated at Eton College
Alumni of Magdalen College, Oxford
Alumni of the Courtauld Institute of Art
Commanders of the Order of the British Empire
British art curators
Living people